

Research
 A study aiming to reconstruct the life cycle of the Early Cambrian brachiopods is published by Madison & Kuzmina (2019).
 A study on the anatomy of plectambonitoid specimens from the Middle Ordovician of Russia, and on its implications for the knowledge of life cycles of these brachiopods, is published online by Madison & Kuzmina (2019).
 A study on the petrographic and geochemical preservation of Ordovician dalmanelloid shells from the Lexington Formation of Kentucky, Sheguindah Shale of Ontario and the Stony Mountain Formation of Manitoba, aiming to test the hypothesis of paleo-latitudinal zonation of the shelly benthos, is published by Azmy & Jin (2019).
 A study on the phylogenetic relationships among strophomenoid brachiopods and on the biogeographical changes in the strophomenoids through time (focusing on the impact of the Late Ordovician mass extinction on the evolutionary history of strophomenoids) is published by Congreve, Krug & Patzkowsky (2019).
 A study on the internal structure of the shell of Semiplanella carinthica is published by Pakhnevich (2019), who names a new tribe Semiplanellini in the subfamily Gigantoproductinae.
 A study on the diet of species of Gigantoproductus from the Viséan of Derbyshire (United Kingdom), and on its implications for the knowledge of mechanisms that enabled those brachiopod species to reach large sizes, is published by Angiolini et al. (2019).
 A study on the relative importance of brachiopods and bivalves in the fossil assemblages from the Carboniferous Pennsylvanian Breathitt Formation of Kentucky is published by Hsieh, Bush & Bennington (2019).
 Description of a specimen of a Permian brachiopod species Spiriferella protodraschei bearing ventrally directed spiralia (lophophore‐supporting, coiled internal structures), and a study on the morphology of these structures and their implications for the knowledge of the feeding system of this brachiopod, is published by Lee et al. (2019).
 A study on the evolution of the body size of brachiopods from the Late Permian to the Middle Triassic, as indicated by brachiopod specimens from South China, is published by Chen et al. (2019).
 A study on the biogeography of Pliensbachian brachiopods in western Tethys Ocean is published online by Vörös & Escarguel (2019).
 A study on changes in the body size of benthic marine brachiopods and bivalves from the Lusitanian Basin (Portugal) before the Toarcian oceanic anoxic event is published by Piazza et al. (2019).
 A study on the impact of the early Toarcian extinction event on fossil brachiopods and bivalves known from the Iberian Range (Spain) is published by Danise et al. (2019).

New taxa

References

2019 in paleontology
2010s in paleontology
2019 in science